"Slow Down" is a song recorded by American singer Selena Gomez from her debut solo studio album, Stars Dance (2013). It was made available for instant digital download along with the pre-order of the album on June 3, 2013. Hollywood Records later sent the song to mainstream radio as the second and final single from the album on August 13, 2013. The song was produced by The Cataracs and David Kuncio, and infuses EDM elements in its instrumentation. Lyrically, the song speaks of slowing down time and living in one magical moment on the dance floor.

Music critics gave a favorable reception to the song, with some praising its catchiness and fun production. Slow Down has achieved moderate success, reaching number 2 in Flanders and peaking inside the top 20 in The Czech Republic, Russia, and South Korea. In the United States, the song peaked at number 27 on the Billboard Hot 100, reached number-one on Billboards Hot Dance Club Songs chart, and it has been certified Platinum by the Recording Industry Association of America (RIAA) for selling over 1,000,000 units of the single in the country. On the Mainstream Top 40 airplay chart, it reached the position of number 7.

The accompanying music video for "Slow Down" was directed by Philip Andelman and filmed in Paris, France. It features Gomez singing along to the track inside of a car, partying in a nightclub, and strutting down the streets of the city. Gomez has performed "Slow Down" in a number of live appearances, including on Good Morning America, The Tonight Show with Jay Leno, Late Show with David Letterman, and UK TV show Surprise, Surprise. It was also performed as the encore of her Stars Dance Tour.

Background and composition

On June 3, 2013, during a live chat on her YouTube channel, Gomez revealed that her debut solo studio album would be titled Stars Dance, and also revealed the album's track listing and cover art. During the same chat, the singer announced she would release "Slow Down" as the second single from the album, after "Come & Get It", and that fans would be able to download the song right after pre-ordering the album on iTunes. On August 13, the song was sent to mainstream radio in the United States, while a digital remixes EP was released the following week on Amazon.com. On September 6, a digital EP with "Lover in Me", "I Like It That Way" and the Cosmic Dawn remix of "Come & Get It" as b-sides, was released through iTunes in some countries including Brazil, Norway, and Vietnam. The EP was released in the United Kingdom on December 8.

The song was written by Lindy Robbins, Julia Michaels, Niles Hollowell-Dhar, David Kuncio and Freddy Wexler and was produced by both Hollowell-Dhar, under the production team pseudonym The Cataracs, and Dave Kuncio. "Slow Down" is a high-octane, uptempo dance-pop and EDM song, that has been described as "wobbly club thumper" by Robert Copsey of Digital Spy. It features a dubstep pre-chorus, funk guitars, a four on the floor beat, and a spoken word outro. Lyrically, the song speaks of not wanting a night to end, with Gomez singing, "Can we take it nice and slow, slow / Break it down and drop it low, low / Cause I just wanna party all night in the neon lights 'til you can't let me go." It is written in the key of C# minor. Gomez's vocals span from the low note of B3 to the high note of C5.

Critical reception
Andrew Hampp of Billboard called the song "harmless, frothy fun", while complimenting its "pseudo-dubstep pre-chorus breakdown, stretched-out staccato vocal loops and not-too-naughty-for Disney lyrics ("You know I'm good with mouth-to-mouth resuscitation")". Caryn Ganz of Rolling Stone noted that Gomez's producers "finally [gave] her tighter tunes" like "Slow Down", adding that it is "ripe for remixing." Writing for the Los Angeles Times, August Brown thought the production "Slow Down" is "rooted in today's pop-EDM default mode, but as that stuff goes, [the song] is pretty capable." PopDust contributor Christina Drill was critical towards the song, considering it "adequate-but-forgettable", and further stating: "the only thing that separates it from the faceless EDM masses? Selena cooing, 'You know I'm good with mouth to mouth resuscitation' in a way that's almost believable. A total whatever." Matthew Horton of Virgin Media deemed it "charmless". Joseph Atilano of the Philippine Daily Inquirer stated that "some of the lyrics are a bit suggestive but there is nothing in them that would turn off any of her loyal fans."

Chart performance
After being released for instant digital download with the pre-order of Stars Dance, "Slow Down" charted in several countries, including Australia, where it peaked at number 91, and in Austria, staying on the country's chart for two weeks before peaking at number 71. The song has charted for 32 weeks in France, and has so far peaked at number 31. In the Ultratip charts from Belgium, it peaked at number 2 in Flanders and number 13 in Wallonia. On the Billboard Hot 100 in the United States, "Slow Down" peaked at number 27, and has been certified Platinum by the Recording Industry Association of America (RIAA). On the Pop Songs component chart, the song entered the top 10 and reached the position of number 7. As of July 2015, "Slow Down" has sold 1 million copies in the United States.

Music video
The accompanying music video for "Slow Down" was directed by Philip Andelman and filmed in Paris, France in May 2013. It leaked online on July 19, and was later uploaded to her official Vevo account. The video features Gomez sitting in the back seat of a Mercedes-Benz 600 (W100) short-wheelbase. The car scenes are combined with her walking the streets of Paris dancing in a club dressed in a two piece outfit with backup dancers in front of pulsating neon lights. Sam Lansky of Idolator commented that the video has "no narrative, but it's Selena being grown-and-sexy, which is more than adequate narrative for me. It's a cherry on top of how fine the Stars Dance era has already been, and it augurs well for what's to come." A blogger for MuchMusic noted similarities on "Slow Down" to early music videos by recording artists Britney Spears, Janet Jackson and Jennifer Lopez.

When the music video for the song was leaked online, Keith Girard of celebrity gossip site The Improper wrote that the music video for "Slow Down" had elements of the death of Diana, Princess of Wales. Keith says that "Selena Gomez’s new video for song “Slow Down” contains some eerie parallels to the death of Princess Diana. Selena races through the Paris streets in a vintage Mercedes similar to Diana's on the night she was killed in a car crash." Caroline Bologna of Hollywood.com picked up on the matter on the same day and mentioned how the footage of the vintage car speeding through tunnels is similar to the princess' death.

Live performances
Gomez performed "Slow Down" on The Tonight Show with Jay Leno on July 24, 2013, and on Good Morning America and Live with Kelly and Michael on July 26. On October 17, she performed the song on The View and Late Show with David Letterman. Gomez then travelled to the United Kingdom and performed the song on Surprise, Surprise on September 20. Gomez also taped a performance on The X Factor USA to be aired originally on November 7; however, due to voting glitches for the day's episode, it aired the following week, on November 14. On November 28, the singer performed "Slow Down" in a medley with "Like a Champion" and "Come & Get It" during Dallas Cowboys Thanksgiving Halftime Show. After the performance was announced, Gomez stated, "I'm from Texas, so I'm a little nervous, I'm not going to lie. But I'm very honored and I hope that we come—me, my dancers and my band—and we give Texas a really good show and I make them proud." "Slow Down" was also performed as the encore of her Stars Dance Tour. The song was also part of the setlist on Gomez's Revival Tour in 2016.

Awards and nominations

Formats and track listings
Digital EP
"Slow Down" – 3:30
"Lover In Me" – 3:28
"I Like It That Way" – 4:11
"Come & Get It" (Cosmic Dawn Club Remix) – 6:29

Digital remixes – EP
"Slow Down" (Chew Fu Refix) – 5:48
"Slow Down" (Danny Verde Remix) – 6:49
"Slow Down" (DJLW Remix) – 6:56
"Slow Down" (Jason Nevins Remix) – 5:54
"Slow Down" (Smash Mode Remix) – 5:21

Reggae remixes
"Slow Down" (Sure Shot Rockers Reggae Remix) – 7:15
"Slow Down" (Sure Shot Rockers Reggae Radio Edit) – 3:38
"Slow Down" (Sure Shot Rockers Reggae Dub Remix) – 3:16

Remixes CD
 "Slow Down" (Chew Fu ReFix)–5:47
 "Slow Down"(Danny Verde Remix) – 6:48
 "Slow Down"(DJLW Remix) – 7:10
 “Slow Down" (Jason Nevins Remix) – 6:00
 "Slow Down" (Smash Mode Remix) – 5:22
 "Slow Down" (Paolo Ortelli & Luke Degree Remix) – 6:11
 “Slow Down” (Enrry Senna Remix) – 6:37
 “Slow Down” (Razor N Gudo Remix) – 7:20
 “Slow Down” (Mike Cruz Remix) – 6:30
 “Slow Down” (Silver A Remix) – 4:35
 “Slow Down” (Ryan Kenny Remix) – 6:04
 “Slow Down” (Sure Shot Rockers Reggae Remix) – 7:16

Credits and personnel 

Recording and management
 Mixed at MixStar Studios 
 Mastered at Sterling Sound 
 Hey Kiddo Music (ASCAP), All Rights administered by Kobalt Songs Music Publishing (ASCAP); Bok Music/Screaming Beauty Music (BMI); Sony/ATV Tunes LLC/Indie Pop Music (ASCAP); David Kuncio (ASCAP)/The Real Brain Publishing (BMI); Electric Fuzz Publishing (BMI)

Personnel

Selena Gomez – vocals
Lindy Robbins – songwriting
Julia Michaels – songwriting
Niles Hollowell-Dhar – songwriting, production (in name of The Cataracs), vocal production
David Kuncio – songwriting, co-production
Freddy Wexler – songwriting
Serban Ghenea – mixing
John Hanes – mixing engineer
Chris Gehringer – mastering

Credits adapted from Stars Dance liner notes.

Charts

Weekly charts

Year-end charts

Certifications

Release history

Promotional release

Single release

See also
  List of number-one dance singles of 2013 (U.S.)

References

2013 singles
2013 songs
Dance-pop songs
Electronic dance music songs
Hollywood Records singles
Music videos directed by Philip Andelman
Music videos shot in France
Selena Gomez songs
Song recordings produced by the Cataracs
Songs written by Freddy Wexler
Songs written by Julia Michaels
Songs written by Kshmr
Songs written by Lindy Robbins